The Internet Assigned Numbers Authority oversees global Internet Protocol address allocation

IANA or Iana may also refer to:

 Iranian Agriculture News Agency, an Iranian official news agency
 Iana, Vaslui, a commune in Romania
 Iana (given name)

See also
 IANA time zone database
 IANAL, an acronym for "I am not a lawyer"